Baranivka is a village in central Ukraine, specifically in Myrhorod Raion of Poltava Oblast.

Geography 
The settlement of Baranivka is situated on the left bank of the river Psel, neighbouring with the settlements of Kuibysheve (upstream in 2.5 km) and  Velykyi Pereviz (2 km downstream). The auto routes Т-1720 and Т-1710 are close to the settlement.

History 
The name of the settlement of Baranivka was first mentioned in the 17th century. In July 1661 the estate on Psel River: the small town of Baranivka and the village Pereviz (now - Baranivka and Velykyi Pereviz), as well as the village Portanka were given to a nobleman Ivan Rudnytskyi. Those time the privilege to own "the hamlet on Psel" was given to Semen Holukhovskyi, a Cossack captain who was a chief of the Cossack Embassy to the Kingdom of Poland.

Economy 
 Milky goods farm
 "Nyva" Private Enterprise

Social infrastructure 

 Settlement Club
 Football club "Nyva-Baranivka"
 Settlement stadium

References

 Weather in Baranivka
 Community project "Baranivka"

Mirgorodsky Uyezd

Villages in Myrhorod Raion